

Events

Pre-1600
1002 – English king Æthelred II orders the killing of all Danes in England, known today as the St. Brice's Day massacre.
1093 – Battle of Alnwick: in an English victory over the Scots, Malcolm III of Scotland, and his son Edward, are killed.
1160 – Louis VII of France marries Adela of Champagne.

1601–1900
1642 – First English Civil War: Battle of Turnham Green: The Royalist forces withdraw in the face of the Parliamentarian army and fail to take London.
1715 – Jacobite rising in Scotland: Battle of Sheriffmuir: The forces of the Kingdom of Great Britain halt the Jacobite advance, although the action is inconclusive.
1775 – American Revolutionary War: Patriot revolutionary forces under Gen. Richard Montgomery occupy Montreal.
1833 – Great Meteor Storm of 1833
1841 – James Braid first sees a demonstration of animal magnetism by Charles Lafontaine, which leads to his study of the subject he eventually calls hypnotism.
1851 – The Denny Party lands at Alki Point, before moving to the other side of Elliott Bay to what would become Seattle.
1864 – American Civil War: The three-day Battle of Bull's Gap ends in a Union rout as Confederates under Major General John C. Breckinridge pursue them to Strawberry Plains, Tennessee.
1887 – Bloody Sunday clashes in central London.

1901–present
1901 – The 1901 Caister lifeboat disaster.
1914 – Zaian War: Berber tribesmen inflict the heaviest defeat of French forces in Morocco at the Battle of El Herri.
1916 – World War I: Prime Minister of Australia Billy Hughes is expelled from the Labor Party over his support for conscription.
1917 – World War I: beginning of the First Battle of Monte Grappa (in Italy known as the "First Battle of the Piave"). The Austro-Hungarian Armed Forces, despite help from the German Alpenkorps and numerical superiority, will fail their offensive against the Italian Army now led by its new chief of staff Armando Diaz.
1918 – World War I: Allied troops occupy Constantinople, the capital of the Ottoman Empire.
1922 – The United States Supreme Court upholds mandatory vaccinations for public school students in Zucht v. King. 
1927 – The Holland Tunnel opens to traffic as the first Hudson River vehicle tunnel linking New Jersey to New York City.
1940 – Walt Disney's animated musical film Fantasia is first released at New York's Broadway Theatre, on the first night of a roadshow.
1942 – World War II: Naval Battle of Guadalcanal: U.S. and Japanese ships engage in an intense, close-quarters surface naval engagement during the Guadalcanal Campaign.
1947 – The Soviet Union completes development of the AK-47, one of the first proper assault rifles.
1950 – General Carlos Delgado Chalbaud, President of Venezuela, is assassinated in Caracas.
1954 – Great Britain defeats France to capture the first ever Rugby League World Cup in Paris in front of around 30,000 spectators.
1956 – The Supreme Court of the United States declares Alabama laws requiring segregated buses illegal, thus ending the Montgomery bus boycott.
1966 – In response to Fatah raids against Israelis near the West Bank border, Israel launches an attack on the village of As-Samu.
1966   – All Nippon Airways Flight 533 crashes into the Seto Inland Sea near Matsuyama Airport in Japan, killing 50 people.
1969 – Vietnam War: Anti-war protesters in Washington, D.C. stage a symbolic March Against Death.
1970 – Bhola cyclone: A  tropical cyclone hits the densely populated Ganges Delta region of East Pakistan (now Bangladesh), killing an estimated 500,000 people in one night.
1982 – Ray Mancini defeats Duk Koo Kim in a boxing match held in Las Vegas. Kim's subsequent death (on November 17) leads to significant changes in the sport.
  1982   – The Vietnam Veterans Memorial is dedicated in Washington, D.C. after a march to its site by thousands of Vietnam War veterans.
1985 – The volcano Nevado del Ruiz erupts and melts a glacier, causing a lahar (volcanic mudslide) that buries Armero, Colombia, killing approximately 23,000 people.
  1985   – Xavier Suárez is sworn in as Miami's first Cuban-born mayor.
1989 – Hans-Adam II, the present Prince of Liechtenstein, begins his reign on the death of his father.
1990 – In Aramoana, New Zealand, David Gray shoots dead 13 people in a massacre before being tracked down and killed by police the next day.
1991 – The Republic of Karelia, an autonomous republic of Russia, is formed from the former Karelian ASSR.
1992 – The High Court of Australia rules in Dietrich v The Queen that although there is no absolute right to have publicly funded counsel, in most circumstances a judge should grant any request for an adjournment or stay when an accused is unrepresented.
1993 – China Northern Airlines Flight 6901 crashes on approach to Ürümqi Diwopu International Airport in Ürümqi, China, killing 12 people.
1994 – In a referendum, voters in Sweden decide to join the European Union.
1995 – Mozambique becomes the first state to join the Commonwealth of Nations without having been part of the former British Empire.
  1995   – A truck-bomb explodes outside of a US-operated Saudi Arabian National Guard training center in Riyadh, killing five Americans and two Indians. A group called the Islamic Movement for Change claims responsibility.
  1995   – Nigeria Airways Flight 357 crashes at Kaduna International Airport in Kaduna, Nigeria, killing 11 people and injuring 66.
2000 – Philippine House Speaker Manny Villar passes the articles of impeachment against Philippine President Joseph Estrada.
2001 – War on Terror: In the first such act since World War II, US President George W. Bush signs an executive order allowing military tribunals against foreigners suspected of connections to terrorist acts or planned acts on the United States.
2002 – Iraq disarmament crisis: Iraq agrees to the terms of the UN Security Council Resolution 1441.
  2002   – During the Prestige oil spill, a storm bursts a tank of the oil tanker MV Prestige, which was not allowed to dock and sank on November 19, 2002, off the coast of Galicia, spilling 63,000 metric tons of heavy fuel oil, more than the Exxon Valdez oil spill.
2012 – A total solar eclipse occurs in parts of Australia and the South Pacific.
2013 – Hawaii legalizes same-sex marriage.
  2013   – 4 World Trade Center officially opens.
2015 – Islamic State operatives carry out a series of coordinated terrorist attacks in Paris, including suicide bombings, mass shootings and a hostage crisis. The terrorists kill 130 people, making it the deadliest attack in France since the Second World War.

Births

Pre-1600
 354 – Augustine of Hippo, Roman bishop and theologian (d. 430)
1312 – Edward III of England (d. 1377)
1453 – Christoph I, Margrave of Baden-Baden (1475–1515) (d. 1527)
1486 – Johann Eck, German theologian and academic (d. 1543)
1493 – William IV, Duke of Bavaria (d. 1550)
1504 – Philip I, Landgrave of Hesse (d. 1567)
1572 – Cyril Lucaris, Greek patriarch and theologian (d. 1638)
1559 – Albert VII, Archduke of Austria, Governor of the Low Countries (d. 1621)

1601–1900
1699 – Jan Zach, Czech violinist, organist, and composer (d. 1773)
1710 – Charles Simon Favart, French director and playwright (d. 1792)
1715 – Dorothea Erxleben, German first female medical doctor (d. 1762)
1732 – John Dickinson, American lawyer and politician, 5th Governor of Pennsylvania (d. 1808)
1760 – Jiaqing Emperor of China (d. 1820)
1761 – John Moore, Scottish general and politician (d. 1809)
1780 – Ranjit Singh, Sikh emperor (d. 1839)
1782 – Esaias Tegnér, Swedish bishop and educator (d. 1846)
1804 – Theophilus H. Holmes, American general (d. 1880)
1809 – John A. Dahlgren, American admiral (d. 1870)
1813 – Petar II Petrović-Njegoš, Montenegrin metropolitan, philosopher, and poet (d. 1851)
1814 – Joseph Hooker, American general (d. 1879)
1833 – Edwin Booth, American actor and manager (d. 1893)
1837 – James T. Rapier, American lawyer and politician (d. 1883)
1838 – Joseph F. Smith, American religious leader, 6th President of The Church of Jesus Christ of Latter-day Saints (d. 1918)
1841 – Edward Burd Grubb, Jr., American general and diplomat, United States Ambassador to Spain (d. 1913)
1847 – Mir Mosharraf Hossain, famous novelist of Bengali literature (d. 1912)
1848 – Albert I, Prince of Monaco (d. 1922)
1850 – Robert Louis Stevenson, Scottish novelist, poet, and essayist (d. 1894)
1853 – John Drew, Jr., American actor (d. 1927)
1854 – George Whitefield Chadwick, American composer and educator (d. 1931)
1856 – Louis Brandeis, American lawyer and jurist (d. 1941)
1864 – James Cannon Jr., American Bishop of the Methodist Episcopal Church, South (d. 1944)
1866 – Abraham Flexner, American educator, founded the Institute for Advanced Study (d. 1959)
1869 – Helene Stöcker, German author and activist (d. 1943)
  1869   – Ariadna Tyrkova-Williams, Russian-American activist, journalist, and politician (d. 1962)
1872 – John M. Lyle, Irish-Canadian architect and educator, designed the Royal Alexandra Theatre (d. 1945)
1878 – Max Dehn, German-American mathematician and academic (d. 1952)
1879 – John Grieb, American gymnast and triathlete (d. 1939)
1881 – Jesús García, Mexican railroad brakeman (d. 1907)
1883 – Leo Goodwin, American swimmer, diver, and water polo player (d. 1957)
1886 – Mary Wigman, German dancer and choreographer (d. 1973)
1893 – Edward Adelbert Doisy, American biochemist and academic, Nobel Prize laureate (d. 1986)
1894 – Bennie Moten, American pianist and bandleader (d. 1935)
  1894   – Arthur Nebe, German SS officer (d. 1945)
1897 – Gertrude Olmstead, American actress (d. 1975)
1899 – Iskander Mirza, Pakistani general and politician, 1st President of Pakistan (d. 1969)
1900 – David Marshall Williams, American convicted murderer and firearms designer (d. 1975)
  1900   – Edward Buzzell, American actor, director, and screenwriter (d. 1985)

1901–present
1904 – H. C. Potter, American director and producer (d. 1977)
1906 – Hermione Baddeley, English actress (d. 1986)
  1906   – A. W. Mailvaganam, Sri Lankan physicist and academic (d. 1987)
  1906   – Eva Zeisel, Hungarian-American potter and designer (d. 2011)
1908 – C. Vann Woodward, American historian, author, and academic (d. 1999)
1909 – Vincent Apap, Maltese sculptor (d. 2003)
1910 – William Bradford Huie, American journalist and author (d. 1986)
  1910   – Pat Reid, Indian-English soldier and author (d. 1990)
1911 – Buck O'Neil, American baseball player and manager (d. 2006)
1913 – V. Appapillai, Sri Lankan physicist and academic (d. 2001)
  1913   – Lon Nol, Cambodian general and politician, 37th Prime Minister of Cambodia (d. 1985)
  1913   – Dimitrios Hatzis, Greek novelist and journalist (d. 1981)
1914 – Amelia Bence, Argentinian actress (d. 2016)
  1914   – Alberto Lattuada, Italian actor, director, and screenwriter (d. 2005)
1917 – Vasantdada Patil, Indian farmer and politician, 9th Governor of Rajasthan (d. 1989)
  1917   – Robert Sterling, American actor (d. 2006)
1918 – George Grant, Canadian philosopher and academic (d. 1988)
1920 – Guillermina Bravo, Mexican dancer, choreographer, and director (d. 2013)
  1920   – Jack Elam, American actor (d. 2003)
1921 – Joonas Kokkonen, Finnish pianist and composer (d. 1996)
1922 – Jack Narz, American game show host and announcer (d. 2008)
  1922   – Oskar Werner, Austrian-German actor (d. 1984)
1923 – Leonard Boyle, Irish and Canadian medievalist and palaeographer (d. 1999)
  1923   – Linda Christian, Mexican-American actress (d. 2011)
1924 – Motoo Kimura, Japanese biologist and geneticist (d. 1994)
1926 – Harry Hughes, American lawyer and politician, 57th Governor of Maryland (d. 2019)
1927 – Albert Turner Bharucha-Reid, American mathematician and theorist (d. 1985)
1928 – Helena Carroll, Scottish-American actress (d. 2013)
  1928   – Hampton Hawes, American pianist and author (d. 1977)
1929 – Robert Bonnaud, French historian and academic (d. 2013)
  1929   – Fred Phelps, American lawyer, pastor, and activist, founded the Westboro Baptist Church (d. 2014)
  1929   – Asashio Tarō III, Japanese sumo wrestler, the 46th Yokozuna (d. 1988)
1930 – Benny Andrews, American painter and academic (d. 2006)
1931 – Adrienne Corri, Scottish actress (d. 2016)
1932 – Buddy Killen, American record producer and music publisher (d. 2006)
  1932   – Richard Mulligan, American actor (d. 2000)
1933 – Don Lane, American-Australian actor, singer, and television host (d. 2009)
  1933   – Ojārs Vācietis, Latvian author and poet (d. 1983) 
1934 – Peter Arnett, New Zealand-American journalist and academic
  1934   – Jimmy Fontana, Italian singer-songwriter and actor (d. 2013)
  1934   – Kamahl, Malaysian-Australian singer
  1934   – Garry Marshall, American actor, director, and producer (d. 2016)
1935 – George Carey, English archbishop and theologian
1936 – Salim Kallas, Syrian actor and politician (d. 2013)
1938 – Gérald Godin, Canadian journalist, poet, and politician (d. 1994)
  1938   – Jack Rule, Jr., American golfer
  1938   – Jean Seberg, American-French actress and singer (d. 1979)
1939 – Karel Brückner, Czech footballer and manager
  1939   – Idris Muhammad, American drummer and composer (d. 2014)
1940 – Saul Kripke, American philosopher and academic (d. 2022)
  1940   – Janet Lawson, American jazz singer and educator
  1940   – Baby Washington, American soul singer
1941 – Eberhard Diepgen, German lawyer and politician, 10th Mayor of Berlin
  1941   – David Green, American businessman and philanthropist, founded Hobby Lobby
  1941   – Dack Rambo, American actor (d. 1994)
  1941   – Mel Stottlemyre, American baseball player and coach (d. 2019)
  1941   – William Taubman, American political scientist and author
1942 – John P. Hammond, American singer-songwriter and guitarist
1943 – Roberto Boninsegna, Italian footballer and manager
  1943   – Jay Sigel, American golfer
  1943   – Howard Wilkinson, English footballer and manager
1944 – Timmy Thomas, American singer-songwriter, keyboard player, and producer
1945 – Masahiro Hasemi, Japanese race car driver
  1945   – Bobby Manuel, American guitarist and producer 
  1945   – Knut Riisnæs, Norwegian saxophonist and composer
1946 – Stanisław Barańczak, Polish-American poet, critic, and scholar (d. 2014)
  1946   – Ray Wylie Hubbard, American country singer-songwriter and guitarist 
1947 – Toy Caldwell, American guitarist and songwriter (d. 1993)
  1947   – Amory Lovins, American physicist and environmentalist
  1947   – Joe Mantegna, American actor and voice artist 
1948 – Humayun Ahmed, Bengali popular writer, dramatist, novelist, screenwriter, lyricist and filmmaker (d. 2012)
1949 – Terry Reid, English singer-songwriter and guitarist
1950 – Mary Lou Metzger, American singer and dancer
  1950   – Gilbert Perreault, Canadian ice hockey player and coach
1951 – Pini Gershon, Israeli basketball player and coach
  1951   – Harry Hurt III, American author and journalist 
1952 – Merrick Garland, American jurist, 86th United States Attorney General
  1952   – Mark Lye, American golfer
  1952   – Art Malik, Pakistani-English actor and producer
1953 – Frances Conroy, American actress 
  1953   – Andrés Manuel López Obrador, President of Mexico (since 2018)
1954 – Scott McNealy, American businessman, co-founded Sun Microsystems
  1954   – Chris Noth, American actor and producer
1955 – Robert Aaron, Canadian jazz musician
  1955   – Bill Britton, American golfer
  1955   – Whoopi Goldberg, American actress, comedian, and talk show host
1956 – Aldo Nova, Canadian singer-songwriter and musician 
1957 – Greg Abbott, American politician, 48th Governor of Texas
  1957   – Nick Baines, English bishop
  1957   – Stephen Baxter, English author
  1957   – Roger Ingram, American trumpet player, educator, and author
1959 – Caroline Goodall, English actress and screenwriter
1960 – Neil Flynn, American actor
  1960   – Teodora Ungureanu, Romanian gymnast and coach
1961 – Kim Polese, American entrepreneur and technology executive
1963 – Jaime Covilhã, Angolan basketball player and coach
  1963   – Vinny Testaverde, American football player
1964 – Timo Rautiainen, Finnish race car driver
  1964   – Dan Sullivan, American politician
1966 – Susanna Haapoja, Finnish politician (d. 2009)
1967 – Juhi Chawla, Indian actress, singer, and producer, Miss India 1984
  1967   – Jimmy Kimmel, American comedian, actor, and talk show host
  1967   – Steve Zahn, American actor and singer
1968 – Pat Hentgen, American baseball player and coach
1969 – Ayaan Hirsi Ali, Somalian-American activist and author
  1969   – Lori Berenson, American activist
  1969   – Gerard Butler, Scottish actor
  1969   – Nico Motchebon, German runner
  1969   – Josh Mancell, American drummer and composer
1972 – Takuya Kimura, Japanese singer
  1972   – Samantha Riley, Australian swimmer
1973 – David Auradou, French rugby player
  1973   – Ari Hoenig, American drummer and composer
1974 – Carl Hoeft, New Zealand rugby player
  1974   – Indrek Zelinski, Estonian footballer and manager
1975 – Tom Compernolle, Belgian runner (d. 2008)
  1975   – Alain Digbeu, French basketball player
  1975   – Ivica Dragutinović, Serbian footballer
  1975   – Quim, Portuguese footballer
  1975   – Toivo Suursoo, Estonian ice hockey player and coach
1976 – Kelly Sotherton, English sprinter and long jumper
  1976   – Hiroshi Tanahashi, Japanese wrestler
1977 – Huang Xiaoming, Chinese actor and singer
1977 – Zulfiqer Russell, Bangladeshi journalist and lyricist
1978 – Nikolai Fraiture, American bass player 
1979 – Kick, Japanese comedian and screenwriter
  1979   – Subliminal, Israeli rapper and producer
  1979   – Metta World Peace, American basketball player and rapper
1980 – Monique Coleman, American actress, singer, and dancer
  1980   – Sara Del Rey, American wrestler and trainer
  1980   – François-Louis Tremblay, Canadian speed skater
1981 – Rivkah, American author and illustrator
  1981   – Ryan Bertin, American wrestler and coach
1982 – Michael Copon, American actor, singer, and producer
  1982   – Samkon Gado, Nigerian-American football player
  1982   – Kumi Koda, Japanese singer-songwriter and actress
  1982   – Adam Shantry, English cricketer
1983 – Kalle Kriit, Estonian cyclist
  1983   – Maleli Kunavore, Fijian rugby player (d. 2012)
1984 – Lucas Barrios, Paraguayan footballer
  1984   – Kurt Morath, Tongan rugby player
  1984   – Jamie Soward, Australian rugby league player and sportscaster
1985 – Asdrúbal Cabrera, Venezuelan baseball player
1986 – Kevin Bridges, Scottish comedian and actor
1987 – Hatsune Matsushima, Japanese model and actress
  1987   – Dana Vollmer, American swimmer
1992 – Dylan Napa, Australian-Cook Islands rugby league player
  1992   – Maksim Podholjuzin, Estonian footballer
1993 – Julia Michaels, American singer and songwriter
1994 – Andrew Tang, Singaporean race car driver
  1994   – Laurien Leurink, Dutch field hockey midfielder
1995 – Oliver Stummvoll, Austrian model
1999 – Lando Norris, British racing driver
2002 – Emma Raducanu, British tennis player

Deaths

Pre-1600
 867 – Pope Nicholas I (b. 800)
1002 – Pallig, Danish chieftain, Jarl of Devonshire
  1002   – Gunhilde, wife of Pallig, Danish chieftain
1004 – Abbo of Fleury, French monk and saint (b. 945)
1072 – Adalbero III of Luxembourg (b. c. 1010)
1093 – Malcolm III of Scotland (b. 1031)
1143 – Fulk, King of Jerusalem (b. 1089)
1154 – Iziaslav II of Kiev, Prince of Vladimir and Volyn, (b. c. 1097)
1175 – Henry of France, Archbishop of Reims (b. c.1121)
1299 – Oliver Sutton, Bishop of Lincoln
1319 – Eric VI of Denmark (b. 1274)
1345 – Constance of Peñafiel, queen of Pedro I of Portugal (b. 1323)
1359 – Ivan II of Moscow (b. 1326)
1369 – Thomas de Beauchamp, 11th Earl of Warwick
1432 – Anne of Burgundy, duchess of Bedford (b. 1404)
1440 – Joan Beaufort, Countess of Westmoreland
1460 – Prince Henry the Navigator, Portuguese patron of exploration (b. 1394)
1502 – Annio da Viterbo, Italian friar, historian, and scholar (b. 1432)

1601–1900
1606 – Girolamo Mercuriale, Italian physician and philologist (b. 1530)
1619 – Ludovico Carracci, Italian painter and illustrator (b. 1555)
1650 – Thomas May, English poet and historian (b. 1595)
1726 – Sophia Dorothea of Celle (b. 1666)
1770 – George Grenville, English lawyer and politician, Prime Minister of the United Kingdom (b. 1712)
1771 – Konrad Ernst Ackermann, German actor (b. 1712)
1777 – William Bowyer, English printer and author (b. 1699)
1862 – Ludwig Uhland, German poet, philologist, and historian (b. 1787)
1863 – Ignacio Comonfort, Mexican soldier and politician. President 1855-1858 (b. 1812)
1867 – Adolphe Napoléon Didron, French archaeologist and historian (b. 1806)
1868 – Gioachino Rossini, Italian pianist and composer (b. 1792)
1872 – Margaret Sarah Carpenter, English painter (b. 1793)
1883 – J. Marion Sims, American physician and gynecologist (b. 1813)

1901–present
1903 – Camille Pissarro, Virgin Islander-French painter (b. 1830)
1921 – Ignác Goldziher, Hungarian scholar of Islam (b. 1850)
1929 – Princess Viktoria of Prussia (b. 1866)
1932 – Francisco Lagos Cházaro, acting president of Mexico (1915) (b. 1878)
1937 – Mrs. Leslie Carter, American actress (b. 1857)
1942 – Daniel J. Callaghan, American admiral (b. 1890)
1952 – Margaret Wise Brown, American author (b. 1910)
1954 – Paul Ludwig Ewald von Kleist, German field marshal (b. 1881)
1955 – Bernard DeVoto, American historian and author (b. 1897)
  1955   – Moshe Pesach, Greek rabbi (b. 1869)
1961 – Anthony Joseph Drexel Biddle, Jr., American general and diplomat, United States Ambassador to Czechoslovakia (b. 1897)
1963 – Margaret Murray, Indian-English anthropologist and author (b. 1863)
1969 – Iskander Mirza, Indian-Pakistani general and politician, 1st President of Pakistan (b. 1899)
1970 – Bessie Braddock, British politician (b. 1899)
1973 – Lila Lee, American actress (b. 1901)
  1973   – Bruno Maderna, Italian-German conductor and composer (b. 1920)
1974 – Vittorio De Sica, Italian-French actor, director, and screenwriter (b. 1901)
  1974   – Karen Silkwood, American technician and activist (b. 1946)
1975 – Olga Bergholz, Russian poet and playwright (b. 1910)
1979 – Dimitris Psathas, Greek playwright and academic (b. 1907)
1982 – Hugues Lapointe, Canadian lawyer and politician, 15th Solicitor General of Canada (b. 1911)
1983 – Henry Jamison Handy, American swimmer and water polo player (b. 1886)
  1983   – Junior Samples, American comedian and actor (b. 1926)
1986 – Franco Cortese, Italian race car driver (b. 1903)
1988 – Antal Doráti, Hungarian-American conductor and composer (b. 1906)
  1988   – Jaromír Vejvoda, Czech composer (b. 1902)
1989 – Victor Davis, Canadian swimmer (b. 1964)
  1989   – Franz Joseph II, Prince of Liechtenstein (b. 1906)
  1989   – Rohana Wijeweera, Sri Lankan rebel and politician (b. 1943)
  1989   – Dorothea Krook-Gilead, Latvian-South African author, translator and scholar (b. 1920)
1991 – Paul-Émile Léger, Canadian cardinal (b. 1904)
1993 – Rufus R. Jones, American wrestler (b. 1933)
1994 – Jack Baker, American actor and screenwriter (b. 1947)
  1994   – Motoo Kimura, Japanese biologist and geneticist (b. 1924)
1996 – Bill Doggett, American pianist and composer (b. 1916)
  1996   – Bobbie Vaile, Australian astrophysicist and academic (b. 1959)
1997 – André Boucourechliev, Bulgarian-French pianist and composer (b. 1925)
1998 – Edwige Feuillère, French actress (b. 1907)
  1998   – Valerie Hobson, Irish-born English actress (b. 1917)
  1998   – Red Holzman, American basketball player and coach (b. 1920)
2001 – Cornelius Warmerdam, American pole vaulter (b. 1915)
2002 – Juan Alberto Schiaffino, Uruguayan footballer and manager (b. 1925)
  2002   – Rishikesh Shaha, Nepalese academic and politician (b. 1925)
2004 – John Balance, English singer-songwriter (b. 1962)
  2004   – Ol' Dirty Bastard, American rapper and producer (b. 1968)
  2004   – Thomas M. Foglietta, American lawyer and politician, United States Ambassador to Italy (b. 1928)
2005 – Vine Deloria, Jr., American historian, theologian, and author (b. 1933)
  2005   – Eddie Guerrero, American wrestler (b. 1967)
2007 – Wahab Akbar, Filipino lawyer and politician (b. 1960)
  2007   – John Doherty, English footballer and manager (b. 1935)
  2007   – Kazuhisa Inao, Japanese baseball player and manager (b. 1937)
2010 – Luis García Berlanga, Spanish director and screenwriter (b. 1921)
  2010   – Allan Sandage, American astronomer and cosmologist (b. 1926)
2012 – Erazm Ciołek, Polish photographer and author (b. 1937)
  2012   – Manuel Peña Escontrela, Spanish footballer (b. 1965)
  2012   – John Sheridan, English rugby player and coach (b. 1933)
2013 – Hans-Jürgen Heise, German author and poet (b. 1930)
  2013   – Chieko Aioi, Japanese actress and voice actress (b. 1934)
2014 – María José Alvarado, Honduran model, Señorita Honduras 2014 (b. 1995)
  2014   – Kakha Bendukidze, Georgian economist and politician, Georgian Minister of Economy (b. 1956)
  2014   – Alvin Dark, American baseball player and manager (b. 1922)
  2014   – Alexander Grothendieck, German-French mathematician and theorist (b. 1928)
2016 – Leon Russell, American singer-songwriter (b. 1942)
2017 – Bobby Doerr, American baseball player and manager (b. 1918)
2020 – Peter Sutcliffe, English serial killer (b. 1946)

Holidays and observances
Christian feast day:
Agostina Livia Pietrantoni
Brice of Tours
Didacus (Diego) of Alcalá
Eugenius II of Toledo
Frances Xavier Cabrini
Homobonus
John Chrysostom (Eastern Orthodox, Repose)
Quintian of Rodez
Saints of the Benedictine family
Saints of the Premonstratensian Order
Stanislaus Kostka
Charles Simeon (Church of England)
The Hundred Thousand Martyrs of Tbilisi (Georgian Orthodox Church)
Sadie Hawkins Day (United States) 
World Kindness Day

References

External links

 
 
 

Days of the year
November